Mithai ( Sweet) is an Indian Hindi romantic comedy drama television series produced by Arvind Babbal under Arvind Babbal Productions. It premiered on 4 April 2022 on Zee TV and streams on ZEE5.  it replaced Rishton Ka Manjha  in its timeslot. It originally stars Debattama Saha and Aashish Bhardwaj as main leads. It is the remake of the Bengali television series with the same name. The series went off-air on 24 September 2022.

Plot 
Mithai, a gifted sweet maker, is on a quest to establish her professional identity. What happens when Mithai's world collides with Siddharth, a software engineer and heir to a traditional sweet making business.

Cast

Main 

 Debattama Saha as Mithai Siddharth Choubey (nee Gosain) - A sweet seller from Jatipura; Indu's daughter; Siddharth's wife. (2022) 
 Aashish Bharadwaj as Siddharth Choubey – A software engineer; Girish and Arti's son; Shubham's half-brother; Keerti's brother; Kavita, Shaurya and Karishma's cousin; Mithai's husband. (2022)

Recurring 

 Yatindra Chaturvedi as Hari Mohan Choubey – Chandrakanta's husband; Girish, Abhishek and Geetika's father; Kavita, Shubham, Siddharth, Shaurya, Keerti and Karishma's grandfather (2022)
 Shaili Shukla as Chandrakanta Choubey – Hari's wife; Girish, Abhishek and Geetika's mother; Kavita, Shubham, Siddharth, Shaurya, Keerti and Karishma's grandmother (2022)
 Saurabh Agrawal as Girish Choubey – Hari and Chandrakanta's elder son; Abhishek and Geetika's brother; Arti's widower; Shubham, Siddharth and Keerti's father (2022)
 Ajit Jha as Abhishek Choubey – Hari and Chandrakanta's younger son; Girish and Geetika's brother; Aabha's husband; Shaurya and Karishma's father. (2022)
 Pooja Dikshit as Aabha Choubey – Abhishek's wife; Shaurya and Karishma's mother. (2022)
 Nidhi Mathur as Geetika Choubey Pathak – Hari and Chandrakanta's daughter; Girish and Abhishek's sister; Pramod's wife; Kavita's mother. (2022)
 Darpan Srivastava as Pramod Pathak – Geetika's husband; Kavita's father. (2022) 
 Subha Saxena as Kavita Pathak – Geetika and Pramod's daughter; Shubham, Siddharth, Shaurya, Keerti and Karishma's cousin; Rajiv's wife. (2022)
 Priom Gujjar as Rajiv – Rohan's brother; Kavita's husband (2022)
 Kervi Udani as Keerti (nee Choubey) – Girish and Arti's daughter; Shubham's half-sister; Siddharth's sister; Kavita, Shaurya and Karishma's cousin; Rohan's wife (2022)
 Nikhilesh Rathore as Shubham Choubey – Girish's illegitimate son; Siddharth and Keerti's half-brother; Kavita, Shaurya and Karishma's cousin. (2022)
 Abhishek Mishra as Shaurya Choubey – Abhishek and Aabha's son; Karishma's brother; Kavita, Shubham, Siddharth and Keerti's cousin. (2022)
 Nisha Jha as Karishma Choubey – Abhishek and Aabha's daughter; Shaurya's sister; Kavita, Shubham, Siddharth and Keerti's cousin; Rohan's ex-love interest. (2022)
 Arjun Singh Shekhawat as Rohan – Rajiv's brother; Karishma's love interest; Keerti's huaband (2022)
 Sumit Singh as Apeksha Sharma – Deepti's daughter; Siddharth's obsessive one-sided lover who wanted to marry him (2022)
 Amita Choksi as Indu Gosain – Mithai's mother; Arti's close friend (2022)
 Narasimhaa Yogi as Bhoora – Mithai's obsessive lover (2022)

Adaptations

References

External links 

 Mithai at ZEE5

2022 Indian television series debuts
Hindi-language television shows
Indian drama television series
Zee TV original programming